Sheet Harbour Consolidated School was  a school located in Sheet Harbour, Nova Scotia, Canada, which welcomed students from grades primary through six. The school was a peanut/nut safe school. In April 2008, Sheet Harbour achieved the Green School Award for the completion of 100 environmental projects. Each year the school had a Holiday/Christmas Concert and a Spring Concert. The children, with the help of the teachers, perform for the parents. Each class has a different performance usually following a theme.

History

This school was built in 1957. This school once hosted the high school students before Duncan MacMillan High School was built. Sheet Harbour Consolidated School also hosted some DMHS students when DMHS had to be closed and torn apart looking for the cause of an unexplained illness that some of the students had in 1997. The school was closed in 2017, as a part of the plan to build one new school in the Sheet Harbour area.

See also
List of schools in Nova Scotia

References

External links
Sheet Harbour Consolidated School (archived June 24, 2017)

Schools in Halifax, Nova Scotia